The following is a partial list of the "C" codes for Medical Subject Headings (MeSH), as defined by the United States National Library of Medicine (NLM).

This list continues the information at List of MeSH codes (C09). Codes following these are found at List of MeSH codes (C11). For other MeSH codes, see List of MeSH codes.

The source for this content is the set of 2006 MeSH Trees from the NLM.

– nervous system diseases

– autoimmune diseases of the nervous system

– demyelinating autoimmune diseases, cns
  – diffuse cerebral sclerosis of schilder
  – encephalomyelitis, acute disseminated
  – leukoencephalitis, acute hemorrhagic
  – multiple sclerosis
  – multiple sclerosis, chronic progressive
  – multiple sclerosis, relapsing-remitting
  – neuromyelitis optica
  – myelitis, transverse
  – neuromyelitis optica
  – neuromyelitis optica

– lambert-eaton myasthenic syndrome

– leukoencephalitis, acute hemorrhagic

– myasthenia gravis
  – myasthenia gravis, autoimmune, experimental
  – myasthenia gravis, neonatal

– nervous system autoimmune disease, experimental
  – encephalomyelitis, autoimmune, experimental
  – myasthenia gravis, autoimmune, experimental
  – neuritis, autoimmune, experimental

– polyradiculoneuropathy
  – guillain-barre syndrome
  – miller fisher syndrome
  – hereditary sensory and autonomic neuropathies
  – dysautonomia, familial
  – polyradiculoneuropathy, chronic inflammatory demyelinating

– stiff-person syndrome

– uveomeningoencephalitic syndrome

– vasculitis, central nervous system
  – aids arteritis, central nervous system
  – lupus vasculitis, central nervous system
  – temporal arteritis

– autonomic nervous system diseases

– aide syndrome

– autonomic dysreflexia

– complex regional pain syndromes
  – causalgia
  – reflex sympathetic dystrophy

– dysautonomia, familial

– horner syndrome

– shy-drager syndrome

– sweating, gustatory

– central nervous system diseases

– brain diseases
  – akinetic mutism
  – amblyopia
  – amnesia, transient global
  – auditory diseases, central
  – auditory perceptual disorders
  – hearing loss, central
  – basal ganglia diseases
  – basal ganglia cerebrovascular disease
  – basal ganglia hemorrhage
  – putaminal hemorrhage
  – chorea gravidarum
  – dystonia musculorum deformans
  – hallervorden-spatz syndrome
  – hepatolenticular degeneration
  – huntington disease
  – meige syndrome
  – multiple system atrophy
  – olivopontocerebellar atrophies
  – shy-drager syndrome
  – striatonigral degeneration
  – neuroleptic malignant syndrome
  – parkinsonian disorders
  – lewy body disease
  – parkinson disease
  – parkinson disease, secondary
  – mptp poisoning
  – parkinson disease, postencephalitic
  – supranuclear palsy, progressive
  – tourette syndrome
  – brain abscess
  – toxoplasmosis, cerebral
  – brain damage, chronic
  – brain injury, chronic
  – cerebral palsy
  – persistent vegetative state
  – brain death
  – brain diseases, metabolic
  – brain diseases, metabolic, inborn
  – abetalipoproteinemia
  – carbamoyl-phosphate synthase i deficiency disease
  – cerebral amyloid angiopathy, familial
  – citrullinemia
  – galactosemias
  – hartnup disease
  – hepatolenticular degeneration
  – homocystinuria
  – hyperargininemia
  – hyperglycinemia, nonketotic
  – hyperlysinemias
  – leigh disease
  – lesch-nyhan syndrome
  – lysosomal storage diseases, nervous system
  – fucosidosis
  – glycogen storage disease type ii
  – mucolipidoses
  – sialic acid storage disease
  – sphingolipidoses
  – fabry disease
  – gangliosidoses
  – gangliosidoses gm2
  – sandhoff disease
  – tay-sachs disease
  – tay-sachs disease, ab variant
  – gangliosidosis gm1
  – sandhoff disease
  – gaucher disease
  – leukodystrophy, globoid cell
  – leukodystrophy, metachromatic
  – niemann-pick diseases
  – maple syrup urine disease
  – melas syndrome
  – menkes kinky hair syndrome
  – merrf syndrome
  – oculocerebrorenal syndrome
  – ornithine carbamoyltransferase deficiency disease
  – peroxisomal disorders
  – adrenoleukodystrophy
  – refsum disease
  – zellweger syndrome
  – phenylketonurias
  – phenylketonuria, maternal
  – pyruvate carboxylase deficiency disease
  – pyruvate dehydrogenase complex deficiency disease
  – tyrosinemias
  – hepatic encephalopathy
  – kernicterus
  – mitochondrial encephalomyopathies
  – myelinolysis, central pontine
  – reye syndrome
  – wernicke encephalopathy
  – brain edema
  – brain injuries
  – brain concussion
  – post-concussion syndrome
  – brain hemorrhage, traumatic
  – brain stem hemorrhage, traumatic
  – cerebral hemorrhage, traumatic
  – brain injury, chronic
  – diffuse axonal injury
  – epilepsy, post-traumatic
  – pneumocephalus
  – brain neoplasms
  – cerebral ventricle neoplasms
  – choroid plexus neoplasms
  – papilloma, choroid plexus
  – infratentorial neoplasms
  – brain stem neoplasms
  – cerebellar neoplasms
  – neurocytoma
  – pinealoma
  – supratentorial neoplasms
  – hypothalamic neoplasms
  – pituitary neoplasms
  – cerebellar diseases
  – cerebellar ataxia
  – spinocerebellar ataxias
  – ataxia telangiectasia
  – machado-joseph disease
  – cerebellar neoplasms
  – dandy-walker syndrome
  – miller fisher syndrome
  – paraneoplastic cerebellar degeneration
  – spinocerebellar degenerations
  – friedreich ataxia
  – myoclonic cerebellar dyssynergia
  – olivopontocerebellar atrophies
  – spinocerebellar ataxias
  – machado-joseph disease
  – cerebrovascular disorders
  – basal ganglia cerebrovascular disease
  – basal ganglia hemorrhage
  – putaminal hemorrhage
  – brain ischemia
  – vertebrobasilar insufficiency
  – subclavian steal syndrome
  – carotid artery diseases
  – carotid artery thrombosis
  – carotid artery injuries
  – carotid artery, internal, dissection
  – carotid-cavernous sinus fistula
  – carotid artery, internal, dissection
  – carotid stenosis
  – carotid-cavernous sinus fistula
  – moyamoya disease
  – cerebrovascular accident
  – brain infarction
  – brain stem infarctions
  – lateral medullary syndrome
  – cerebral infarction
  – infarction, anterior cerebral artery
  – infarction, middle cerebral artery
  – infarction, posterior cerebral artery
  – cerebrovascular trauma
  – carotid artery injuries
  – carotid artery, internal, dissection
  – carotid-cavernous sinus fistula
  – vertebral artery dissection
  – dementia, vascular
  – cadasil
  – dementia, multi-infarct
  – hypoxia-ischemia, brain
  – brain ischemia
  – ischemic attack, transient
  – hypoxia, brain
  – intracranial arterial diseases
  – cerebral arterial diseases
  – cadasil
  – cerebral amyloid angiopathy
  – cerebral amyloid angiopathy, familial
  – infarction, anterior cerebral artery
  – infarction, middle cerebral artery
  – infarction, posterior cerebral artery
  – intracranial aneurysm
  – intracranial arteriosclerosis
  – dementia, vascular
  – intracranial arteriovenous malformations
  – intracranial arteriovenous malformations
  – intracranial embolism and thrombosis
  – intracranial embolism
  – intracranial thrombosis
  – sinus thrombosis, intracranial
  – cavernous sinus thrombosis
  – lateral sinus thrombosis
  – sagittal sinus thrombosis
  – intracranial hemorrhages
  – cerebral hemorrhage
  – basal ganglia hemorrhage
  – putaminal hemorrhage
  – cerebral hemorrhage, traumatic
  – intracranial hemorrhage, hypertensive
  – intracranial hemorrhage, traumatic
  – brain hemorrhage, traumatic
  – brain stem hemorrhage, traumatic
  – cerebral hemorrhage, traumatic
  – hematoma, epidural, cranial
  – hematoma, subdural
  – hematoma, subdural, acute
  – hematoma, subdural, chronic
  – hematoma, subdural, intracranial
  – subarachnoid hemorrhage, traumatic
  – pituitary apoplexy
  – subarachnoid hemorrhage
  – subarachnoid hemorrhage, traumatic
  – leukomalacia, periventricular
  – sneddon syndrome
  – vascular headaches
  – vasculitis, central nervous system
  – aids arteritis, central nervous system
  – lupus vasculitis, central nervous system
  – temporal arteritis
  – vasospasm, intracranial
  – vertebral artery dissection
  – dementia
  – aids dementia complex
  – alzheimer disease
  – primary progressive aphasia
  – creutzfeldt-jakob syndrome
  – dementia, vascular
  – dementia, multi-infarct
  – huntington disease
  – Klüver-Bucy syndrome
  – lewy body disease
  – pick disease of the brain
  – diffuse cerebral sclerosis of schilder
  – encephalitis
  – encephalomyelitis
  – limbic encephalitis
  – meningoencephalitis
  – lupus vasculitis, central nervous system
  – encephalomalacia
  – leukomalacia, periventricular
  – epilepsy
  – epilepsies, myoclonic
  – myoclonic epilepsy, juvenile
  – myoclonic epilepsies, progressive
  – lafora disease
  – merrf syndrome
  – unverricht-lundborg syndrome
  – epilepsies, partial
  – epilepsy, complex partial
  – epilepsy, frontal lobe
  – epilepsy, partial, motor
  – epilepsy, partial, sensory
  – epilepsy, rolandic
  – epilepsy, temporal lobe
  – epilepsy, benign neonatal
  – epilepsy, generalized
  – epilepsy, absence
  – epilepsy, tonic-clonic
  – spasms, infantile
  – epilepsy, post-traumatic
  – epilepsy, reflex
  – landau-kleffner syndrome
  – seizures
  – seizures, febrile
  – status epilepticus
  – epilepsia partialis continua
  – headache disorders
  – headache disorders, primary
  – migraine disorders
  – migraine with aura
  – migraine without aura
  – tension-type headache
  – trigeminal autonomic cephalalgias
  – cluster headache
  – paroxysmal hemicrania
  – sunct syndrome
  – headache disorders, secondary
  – post-dural puncture headache
  – post-traumatic headache
  – vascular headaches
  – hydrocephalus
  – dandy-walker syndrome
  – hydrocephalus, normal pressure
  – hypothalamic diseases
  – bardet-biedl syndrome
  – hypothalamic neoplasms
  – pituitary neoplasms
  – laurence-moon syndrome
  – pituitary diseases
  – empty sella syndrome
  – hyperpituitarism
  – acromegaly
  – hyperprolactinemia
  – pituitary acth hypersecretion
  – hypopituitarism
  – dwarfism, pituitary
  – inappropriate adh syndrome
  – pituitary apoplexy
  – pituitary neoplasms
  – acth-secreting pituitary adenoma
  – nelson syndrome
  – growth hormone-secreting pituitary adenoma
  – prolactinoma
  – intracranial hypertension
  – hydrocephalus
  – dandy-walker syndrome
  – hypertensive encephalopathy
  – pseudotumor cerebri
  – intracranial hypotension
  – kluver-Bucy syndrome
  – neuroaxonal dystrophies
  – hallervorden-spatz syndrome
  – subdural effusion
  – thalamic diseases

– central nervous system infections
  – brain abscess
  – toxoplasmosis, cerebral
  – central nervous system bacterial infections
  – brain abscess
  – empyema, subdural
  – epidural abscess
  – lyme neuroborreliosis
  – meningitis, bacterial
  – meningitis, escherichia coli
  – meningitis, haemophilus
  – meningitis, listeria
  – meningitis, meningococcal
  – waterhouse-friderichsen syndrome
  – meningitis, pneumococcal
  – tuberculosis, meningeal
  – neurosyphilis
  – tabes dorsalis
  – tuberculosis, central nervous system
  – tuberculoma, intracranial
  – tuberculosis, meningeal
  – central nervous system fungal infections
  – meningitis, fungal
  – meningitis, cryptococcal
  – neuroaspergillosis
  – central nervous system parasitic infections
  – central nervous system helminthiasis
  – neurocysticercosis
  – neuroschistosomiasis
  – central nervous system protozoal infections
  – malaria, cerebral
  – toxoplasmosis, cerebral
  – toxoplasmosis, congenital
  – central nervous system viral diseases
  – encephalitis
  – encephalitis, viral
  – encephalitis, arbovirus
  – encephalitis, california
  – encephalitis, japanese
  – encephalitis, st. louis
  – encephalitis, tick-borne
  – west nile fever
  – encephalitis, herpes simplex
  – encephalitis, varicella zoster
  – encephalomyelitis, equine
  – encephalomyelitis, eastern equine
  – encephalomyelitis, venezuelan equine
  – encephalomyelitis, western equine
  – leukoencephalopathy, progressive multifocal
  – subacute sclerosing panencephalitis
  – meningitis, viral
  – lymphocytic choriomeningitis
  – meningitis, aseptic
  – myelitis
  – paraparesis, tropical spastic
  – poliomyelitis
  – poliomyelitis
  – poliomyelitis, bulbar
  – postpoliomyelitis syndrome
  – pseudorabies
  – empyema, subdural
  – encephalitis
  – encephalitis, viral
  – encephalitis, arbovirus
  – encephalitis, california
  – encephalitis, japanese
  – encephalitis, st. louis
  – encephalitis, tick-borne
  – west nile fever
  – encephalitis, herpes simplex
  – encephalitis, varicella zoster
  – encephalomyelitis, equine
  – encephalomyelitis, eastern equine
  – encephalomyelitis, venezuelan equine
  – encephalomyelitis, western equine
  – leukoencephalopathy, progressive multifocal
  – subacute sclerosing panencephalitis
  – meningoencephalitis
  – lupus vasculitis, central nervous system
  – leukoencephalitis, acute hemorrhagic
  – limbic encephalitis
  – encephalomyelitis
  – encephalomyelitis, equine
  – encephalomyelitis, eastern equine
  – encephalomyelitis, venezuelan equine
  – encephalomyelitis, western equine
  – epidural abscess
  – meningitis
  – arachnoiditis
  – meningitis, aseptic
  – meningitis, bacterial
  – meningitis, escherichia coli
  – meningitis, haemophilus
  – meningitis, listeria
  – meningitis, meningococcal
  – waterhouse-friderichsen syndrome
  – meningitis, pneumococcal
  – tuberculosis, meningeal
  – meningitis, fungal
  – meningitis, cryptococcal
  – meningitis, viral
  – lymphocytic choriomeningitis
  – meningitis, aseptic
  – meningoencephalitis
  – lupus vasculitis, central nervous system
  – meningoencephalitis
  – lupus vasculitis, central nervous system
  – uveomeningoencephalitic syndrome
  – myelitis
  – paraparesis, tropical spastic
  – poliomyelitis
  – perimeningeal infections
  – empyema, subdural
  – epidural abscess
  – subdural effusion
  – prion diseases
  – creutzfeldt-jakob syndrome
  – encephalopathy, bovine spongiform
  – gerstmann-straussler-scheinker disease
  – insomnia, fatal familial
  – Kuru
  – scrapie
  – wasting disease, chronic

– encephalomyelitis
  – encephalomyelitis, equine
  – encephalomyelitis, eastern equine
  – encephalomyelitis, venezuelan equine
  – encephalomyelitis, western equine
  – fatigue syndrome, chronic
  – leukoencephalitis, acute hemorrhagic

– high pressure neurological syndrome

– meningitis
  – meningoencephalitis
  – lupus vasculitis, central nervous system

– movement disorders
  – angelman syndrome
  – choreatic disorders
  – chorea gravidarum
  – huntington disease
  – dystonic disorders
  – dystonia musculorum deformans
  – meige syndrome
  – torticollis
  – essential tremor
  – hallervorden-spatz syndrome
  – hepatolenticular degeneration
  – multiple system atrophy
  – olivopontocerebellar atrophies
  – shy-drager syndrome
  – striatonigral degeneration
  – parkinsonian disorders
  – lewy body disease
  – parkinson disease
  – parkinson disease, secondary
  – mptp poisoning
  – parkinson disease, postencephalitic
  – supranuclear palsy, progressive
  – Tic disorders
  – Tourette syndrome

– ocular motility disorders

– pneumocephalus

– spinal cord diseases
  – amyotrophic lateral sclerosis
  – epidural abscess
  – muscular atrophy, spinal
  – spinal muscular atrophies of childhood
  – myelitis
  – myelitis, transverse
  – paraparesis, tropical spastic
  – poliomyelitis
  – poliomyelitis
  – postpoliomyelitis syndrome
  – spinal cord compression
  – spinal cord neoplasms
  – epidural neoplasms
  – spinal cord injuries
  – central cord syndrome
  – spinal cord vascular diseases
  – anterior spinal artery syndrome
  – spinal cord ischemia
  – anterior spinal artery syndrome
  – spinocerebellar degenerations
  – friedreich ataxia
  – myoclonic cerebellar dyssynergia
  – olivopontocerebellar atrophies
  – spinocerebellar ataxias
  – machado-joseph disease
  – stiff-person syndrome
  – syringomyelia
  – tabes dorsalis

– chronobiology disorders

– jet lag syndrome

– sleep disorders, circadian rhythm

– cranial nerve diseases

– abducens nerve diseases
  – abducens nerve injury

– accessory nerve diseases

– cranial nerve neoplasms
  – neuroma, acoustic
  – neurofibromatosis 2
  – optic nerve neoplasms
  – optic nerve glioma

– cranial nerve injuries
  – abducens nerve injury
  – facial nerve injuries
  – optic nerve injuries

– facial nerve diseases
  – bell palsy
  – facial hemiatrophy
  – facial nerve injuries
  – facial neuralgia
  – herpes zoster oticus
  – melkersson-rosenthal syndrome
  – mobius syndrome

– facial neuralgia

– glossopharyngeal nerve diseases

– hypoglossal nerve diseases

– ocular motility disorders
  – duane retraction syndrome
  – miller fisher syndrome
  – nystagmus, pathologic
  – nystagmus, congenital
  – oculomotor nerve diseases
  – ophthalmoplegia
  – ophthalmoplegia, chronic progressive external
  – supranuclear palsy, progressive
  – ophthalmoplegia, chronic progressive external
  – kearns-sayer syndrome
  – strabismus
  – esotropia
  – exotropia
  – tolosa-hunt syndrome

– oculomotor nerve diseases
  – aide syndrome

– olfactory nerve diseases
  – esthesioneuroblastoma, olfactory

– optic nerve diseases
  – optic atrophy
  – optic atrophies, hereditary
  – optic atrophy, hereditary, leber
  – optic atrophy, autosomal dominant
  – wolfram syndrome
  – optic disk drusen
  – optic nerve injuries
  – optic nerve neoplasms
  – optic nerve glioma
  – optic neuritis
  – neuromyelitis optica
  – optic neuropathy, ischemic
  – papilledema

– trigeminal nerve diseases
  – trigeminal neuralgia

– trochlear nerve diseases

– vagus nerve diseases
  – vocal cord paralysis

– vestibulocochlear nerve diseases
  – neuroma, acoustic
  – neurofibromatosis 2
  – vestibular neuronitis

– demyelinating diseases

– demyelinating autoimmune diseases, cns
  – diffuse cerebral sclerosis of schilder
  – encephalomyelitis, acute disseminated
  – encephalomyelitis, autoimmune, experimental
  – leukoencephalitis, acute hemorrhagic
  – multiple sclerosis
  – multiple sclerosis, chronic progressive
  – multiple sclerosis, relapsing-remitting
  – neuromyelitis optica
  – myelitis, transverse
  – neuromyelitis optica
  – neuromyelitis optica

– hereditary central nervous system demyelinating diseases
  – adrenoleukodystrophy
  – alexander disease
  – canavan disease
  – leukodystrophy, globoid cell
  – leukodystrophy, metachromatic
  – pelizaeus-merzbacher disease

– leukoencephalopathy, progressive multifocal

– myelinolysis, central pontine

– polyradiculoneuropathy
  – polyradiculoneuropathy, chronic inflammatory demyelinating
  – guillain-barre syndrome
  – miller fisher syndrome
  – hereditary sensory and autonomic neuropathies
  – dysautonomia, familial

– nervous system malformations

– central nervous system cysts
  – arachnoid cysts

– central nervous system vascular malformations
  – hemangioma, cavernous, central nervous system
  – central nervous system venous angioma
  – sinus pericranii

– dandy-walker syndrome

– hereditary motor and sensory neuropathies
  – charcot-marie-tooth disease
  – refsum disease
  – spastic paraplegia, hereditary

– hereditary sensory and autonomic neuropathies
  – dysautonomia, familial

– holoprosencephaly

– hydranencephaly

– intracranial arteriovenous malformations

– neural tube defects
  – anencephaly
  – arnold-chiari malformation
  – encephalocele
  – meningocele
  – meningomyelocele
  – spinal dysraphism
  – spina bifida cystica
  – spina bifida occulta

– septo-optic dysplasia

– nervous system neoplasms

– central nervous system neoplasms
  – brain neoplasms
  – cerebral ventricle neoplasms
  – choroid plexus neoplasms
  – papilloma, choroid plexus
  – infratentorial neoplasms
  – brain stem neoplasms
  – cerebellar neoplasms
  – neurocytoma
  – pinealoma
  – supratentorial neoplasms
  – hypothalamic neoplasms
  – pituitary neoplasms
  – central nervous system cysts
  – arachnoid cysts
  – meningeal neoplasms
  – meningioma
  – spinal cord neoplasms
  – epidural neoplasms

– cranial nerve neoplasms
  – optic nerve neoplasms
  – optic nerve glioma

– neuroma, acoustic
  – neurofibromatosis 2

– peripheral nervous system neoplasms
  – nerve sheath neoplasms
  – neurilemmoma
  – neurofibroma
  – neurofibroma, plexiform
  – neurofibrosarcoma

– neurocutaneous syndromes

– ataxia telangiectasia

– hippel-lindau disease

– neurofibromatosis
  – neurofibromatosis 1
  – neurofibromatosis 2

– sturge-weber syndrome

– tuberous sclerosis

– neurodegenerative diseases

– heredodegenerative disorders, nervous system
  – alexander disease
  – amyloid neuropathies, familial
  – canavan disease
  – cockayne syndrome
  – dystonia musculorum deformans
  – gerstmann-straussler-scheinker disease
  – hallervorden-spatz syndrome
  – hepatolenticular degeneration
  – hereditary central nervous system demyelinating diseases
  – hereditary motor and sensory neuropathies
  – charcot-marie-tooth disease
  – refsum disease
  – spastic paraplegia, hereditary
  – hereditary sensory and autonomic neuropathies
  – dysautonomia, familial
  – huntington disease
  – lafora disease
  – lesch-nyhan syndrome
  – menkes kinky hair syndrome
  – myotonia congenita
  – myotonic dystrophy
  – neurofibromatosis
  – neurofibromatosis 1
  – neurofibromatosis 2
  – neuronal ceroid-lipofuscinosis
  – optic atrophies, hereditary
  – optic atrophy, hereditary, leber
  – optic atrophy, autosomal dominant
  – wolfram syndrome
  – rett syndrome
  – spinal muscular atrophies of childhood
  – spinocerebellar degenerations
  – friedreich ataxia
  – myoclonic cerebellar dyssynergia
  – olivopontocerebellar atrophies
  – spinocerebellar ataxias
  – machado-joseph disease
  – tourette syndrome
  – tuberous sclerosis
  – unverricht-lundborg syndrome

– lewy body disease

– motor neuron disease
  – amyotrophic lateral sclerosis
  – bulbar palsy, progressive
  – muscular atrophy, spinal
  – spinal muscular atrophies of childhood

– multiple system atrophy
  – olivopontocerebellar atrophies
  – shy-drager syndrome
  – striatonigral degeneration

– olivopontocerebellar atrophies

– paraneoplastic syndromes, nervous system
  – lambert-eaton myasthenic syndrome
  – limbic encephalitis
  – myelitis, transverse
  – paraneoplastic cerebellar degeneration
  – paraneoplastic polyneuropathy

– parkinson disease

– postpoliomyelitis syndrome

– prion diseases
  – encephalopathy, bovine spongiform
  – gerstmann-straussler-scheinker disease
  – insomnia, fatal familial
  – Kuru
  – scrapie
  – wasting disease, chronic

– shy-drager syndrome

– tauopathies
  – alzheimer disease
  – supranuclear palsy, progressive

– neurologic manifestations

– bladder, neurogenic

– cerebrospinal fluid otorrhea

– cerebrospinal fluid rhinorrhea

– decerebrate state

– dyskinesias
  – ataxia
  – cerebellar ataxia
  – spinocerebellar ataxias
  – ataxia telangiectasia
  – machado-joseph disease
  – gait ataxia
  – athetosis
  – catalepsy
  – chorea
  – dystonia
  – torticollis
  – hyperkinesis
  – hypokinesia
  – myoclonus
  – psychomotor agitation
  – synkinesis
  – tics
  – tremor

– gait disorders, neurologic
  – gait apraxia
  – gait ataxia

– meningism

– neurobehavioral manifestations
  – catatonia
  – communication disorders
  – language disorders
  – agraphia
  – anomic aphasia
  – dyslexia
  – alexia (acquired dyslexia)
  – alexia, pure
  – language development disorders
  – speech disorders
  – aphasia
  – expressive aphasia
  – aphasia, conduction
  – primary progressive aphasia
  – receptive aphasia
  – articulation disorders
  – dysarthria
  – echolalia
  – mutism
  – stuttering
  – learning disorders
  – dyslexia
  – alexia (acquired dyslexia)
  – confusion
  – delirium
  – consciousness disorders
  – unconsciousness
  – coma
  – brain death
  – coma, post-head injury
  – insulin coma
  – persistent vegetative state
  – syncope
  – syncope, vasovagal
  – memory disorders
  – amnesia
  – amnesia, anterograde
  – amnesia, retrograde
  – amnesia, transient global
  – korsakoff syndrome
  – mental retardation
  – cri-du-chat syndrome
  – de lange syndrome
  – down syndrome
  – mental retardation, x-linked
  – adrenoleukodystrophy
  – coffin-lowry syndrome
  – fragile x syndrome
  – glycogen storage disease type iib
  – lesch-nyhan syndrome
  – menkes kinky hair syndrome
  – mucopolysaccharidosis ii
  – pyruvate dehydrogenase complex deficiency disease
  – rett syndrome
  – prader-willi syndrome
  – rubinstein-taybi syndrome
  – wagr syndrome
  – williams syndrome
  – perceptual disorders
  – agnosia
  – gerstmann syndrome
  – prosopagnosia
  – auditory perceptual disorders
  – hallucinations
  – illusions
  – phantom limb
  – psychomotor disorders
  – apraxias
  – apraxia, ideomotor
  – gait apraxia
  – psychomotor agitation

– neurogenic inflammation

– neuromuscular manifestations
  – fasciculation
  – muscle cramp
  – muscle hypertonia
  – muscle rigidity
  – muscle spasticity
  – muscle hypotonia
  – muscle weakness
  – muscular atrophy
  – myokymia
  – myotonia
  – spasm
  – hemifacial spasm
  – trismus
  – tetany

– pain
  – back pain
  – low back pain
  – facial pain
  – headache
  – labor pain
  – metatarsalgia
  – neck pain
  – neuralgia
  – neuralgia, postherpetic
  – sciatica
  – pain, intractable

– paralysis
  – facial paralysis
  – hemiplegia
  – ophthalmoplegia
  – ophthalmoplegia, chronic progressive external
  – supranuclear palsy, progressive
  – paraplegia
  – brown-sequard syndrome
  – pseudobulbar palsy
  – quadriplegia
  – respiratory paralysis
  – vocal cord paralysis

– paresis
  – paraparesis
  – paraparesis, spastic

– pupil disorders
  – anisocoria
  – miosis
  – horner syndrome
  – tonic pupil

– reflex, abnormal
  – reflex, babinski

– seizures
  – alcohol withdrawal seizures

– sensation disorders
  – dizziness
  – hearing disorders
  – hearing loss
  – deafness
  – hearing loss, bilateral
  – hearing loss, conductive
  – hearing loss, functional
  – hearing loss, high-frequency
  – hearing loss, mixed conductive-sensorineural
  – hearing loss, sensorineural
  – hearing loss, central
  – hearing loss, noise-induced
  – presbycusis
  – usher syndromes
  – hearing loss, sudden
  – hearing loss, unilateral
  – hyperacusis
  – tinnitus
  – olfaction disorders
  – somatosensory disorders
  – hyperalgesia
  – hyperesthesia
  – hypesthesia
  – paresthesia
  – taste disorders
  – ageusia
  – dysgeusia
  – vision disorders
  – amblyopia
  – blindness
  – amaurosis fugax
  – blindness, cortical
  – color vision defects
  – diplopia
  – hemianopsia
  – photophobia
  – scotoma
  – vision, low

– vertigo

– voice disorders
  – aphonia
  – hoarseness

– neuromuscular diseases

– fatigue syndrome, chronic

– isaacs syndrome

– motor neuron disease
  – amyotrophic lateral sclerosis
  – bulbar palsy, progressive
  – muscular atrophy, spinal
  – spinal muscular atrophies of childhood
  – poliomyelitis
  – postpoliomyelitis syndrome

– muscular atrophy, spinal
  – spinal muscular atrophies of childhood

– muscular diseases
  – muscular disorders, atrophic
  – muscular dystrophies
  – distal myopathies
  – muscular dystrophies, limb-girdle
  – muscular dystrophy, duchenne
  – muscular dystrophy, emery-dreifuss
  – muscular dystrophy, facioscapulohumeral
  – muscular dystrophy, oculopharyngeal
  – myotonic dystrophy
  – postpoliomyelitis syndrome
  – eosinophilia-myalgia syndrome
  – fibromyalgia
  – mitochondrial myopathies
  – mitochondrial encephalomyopathies
  – melas syndrome
  – merrf syndrome
  – ophthalmoplegia, chronic progressive external
  – kearns-sayer syndrome
  – myopathies, structural, congenital
  – myopathies, nemaline
  – myopathy, central core
  – myositis
  – dermatomyositis
  – myositis, inclusion body
  – polymyositis
  – dermatomyositis
  – myotonic disorders
  – myotonia congenita
  – myotonic dystrophy
  – paralyses, familial periodic
  – hypokalemic periodic paralysis
  – paralysis, hyperkalemic periodic

– muscular disorders, atrophic
  – postpoliomyelitis syndrome

– neuromuscular junction diseases
  – botulism
  – lambert-eaton myasthenic syndrome
  – myasthenia gravis
  – myasthenia gravis, autoimmune, experimental
  – myasthenia gravis, neonatal
  – myasthenic syndromes, congenital

– peripheral nervous system diseases
  – acrodynia
  – amyloid neuropathies
  – amyloid neuropathies, familial
  – brachial plexus neuropathies
  – brachial plexus neuritis
  – complex regional pain syndromes
  – causalgia
  – reflex sympathetic dystrophy
  – diabetic neuropathies
  – guillain-barre syndrome
  – miller fisher syndrome
  – isaacs syndrome
  – mononeuropathies
  – femoral neuropathy
  – median neuropathy
  – carpal tunnel syndrome
  – peroneal neuropathies
  – radial neuropathy
  – sciatic neuropathy
  – sciatica
  – tibial neuropathy
  – tarsal tunnel syndrome
  – ulnar neuropathies
  – cubital tunnel syndrome
  – ulnar nerve compression syndromes
  – nerve compression syndromes
  – carpal tunnel syndrome
  – tarsal tunnel syndrome
  – thoracic outlet syndrome
  – cervical rib syndrome
  – ulnar nerve compression syndromes
  – cubital tunnel syndrome
  – neuralgia
  – causalgia
  – neuralgia, postherpetic
  – sciatica
  – neuritis
  – brachial plexus neuritis
  – neuritis, autoimmune, experimental
  – neurofibromatosis 1
  – pain insensitivity, congenital
  – peripheral nervous system neoplasms
  – nerve sheath neoplasms
  – neurilemmoma
  – neurofibroma
  – neurofibroma, plexiform
  – neurofibrosarcoma
  – polyneuropathies
  – alcoholic neuropathy
  – hereditary motor and sensory neuropathies
  – charcot-marie-tooth disease
  – refsum disease
  – spastic paraplegia, hereditary
  – hereditary sensory and autonomic neuropathies
  – dysautonomia, familial
  – paraneoplastic polyneuropathy
  – poems syndrome
  – polyradiculoneuropathy
  – guillain-barre syndrome
  – miller fisher syndrome
  – hereditary sensory and autonomic neuropathies
  – dysautonomia, familial
  – polyradiculoneuropathy, chronic inflammatory demyelinating
  – polyradiculopathy
  – radiculopathy
  – tangier disease

– stiff-person syndrome

– neurotoxicity syndromes

– akathisia, drug-induced

– alcohol-induced disorders, nervous system
  – alcohol amnestic disorder
  – korsakoff syndrome
  – alcohol withdrawal delirium
  – alcohol withdrawal seizures
  – alcoholic neuropathy

– botulism

– dyskinesia, drug-induced

– heavy metal poisoning, nervous system
  – arsenic poisoning
  – lead poisoning, nervous system
  – lead poisoning, nervous system, adult
  – lead poisoning, nervous system, childhood
  – manganese poisoning
  – mercury poisoning, nervous system
  – acrodynia

– mptp poisoning

– neuroleptic malignant syndrome

– sleep disorders

– dyssomnias
  – sleep deprivation
  – sleep disorders, circadian rhythm
  – jet lag syndrome
  – sleep disorders, intrinsic
  – disorders of excessive somnolence
  – hypersomnolence, idiopathic
  – kleine-levin syndrome
  – narcolepsy
  – cataplexy
  – nocturnal myoclonus syndrome
  – restless legs syndrome
  – sleep apnea syndromes
  – sleep apnea, central
  – sleep apnea, obstructive
  – obesity hypoventilation syndrome
  – sleep initiation and maintenance disorders
  – insomnia, fatal familial

– parasomnias
  – nocturnal myoclonus syndrome
  – nocturnal paroxysmal dystonia
  – rem sleep parasomnias
  – rem sleep behavior disorder
  – sleep paralysis
  – restless legs syndrome
  – sleep arousal disorders
  – night terrors
  – somnambulism
  – sleep bruxism
  – sleep-wake transition disorders

– trauma, nervous system

– cerebrovascular trauma
  – carotid artery injuries
  – carotid artery, internal, dissection
  – carotid-cavernous sinus fistula
  – vertebral artery dissection

– craniocerebral trauma
  – brain injuries
  – brain concussion
  – post-concussion syndrome
  – brain hemorrhage, traumatic
  – brain stem hemorrhage, traumatic
  – cerebral hemorrhage, traumatic
  – brain injury, chronic
  – diffuse axonal injury
  – epilepsy, post-traumatic
  – pneumocephalus
  – shaken baby syndrome
  – cerebrospinal fluid otorrhea
  – cerebrospinal fluid rhinorrhea
  – coma, post-head injury
  – cranial nerve injuries
  – abducens nerve injury
  – facial nerve injuries
  – optic nerve injuries
  – head injuries, closed
  – brain concussion
  – post-concussion syndrome
  – head injuries, penetrating
  – intracranial hemorrhage, traumatic
  – brain hemorrhage, traumatic
  – brain stem hemorrhage, traumatic
  – cerebral hemorrhage, traumatic
  – hematoma, epidural, cranial
  – hematoma, subdural
  – hematoma, subdural, acute
  – hematoma, subdural, chronic
  – hematoma, subdural, intracranial
  – subarachnoid hemorrhage, traumatic
  – skull fractures
  – skull fracture, basilar
  – skull fracture, depressed

– spinal cord injuries
  – autonomic dysreflexia
  – central cord syndrome

The list continues at List of MeSH codes (C11).

C10